Taal Volcano is a large caldera filled by Taal Lake in the Philippines. Located in the province of Batangas, the volcano is second of the most active volcanoes in the country, with 38 recorded historical eruptions, all of which were concentrated on Volcano Island, near the middle of Taal Lake. The caldera was formed by prehistoric eruptions between 140,000 and 5,380 BP.

Taal Volcano has had several violent eruptions in the past, causing deaths on the island and the populated areas surrounding the lake, with an overall death toll of about 6,000. Because of its proximity to populated areas and its eruptive history, the volcano was designated a Decade Volcano, worthy of close study to prevent future natural disasters. All volcanoes in the Philippines are part of the Ring of Fire.

Etymology 
Taal Volcano was known as Bombou or Bombon in the 1800s.

The municipality of Taal and the Taa-lan River (now known as Pansipit River) were named after the Taa-lan tree, which grows along the river. The tree also grew along the shore of Bombon Lake (now known as Taal Lake). The Taa-lan River was a narrow channel that connects the present-day Taal Lake and Balayan Bay to each other.

Taal is a Tagalog word in the Batangueño dialect that means true, genuine, and pure.

Geography 
Taal Volcano is part of a chain of volcanoes lining the western edge of the island of Luzon. They were formed by the subduction of the Eurasian Plate underneath the Philippine Mobile Belt. Taal Lake lies within a  caldera formed by explosive eruptions between 140,000 and 5,380 BP. Each of these eruptions created extensive ignimbrite deposits reaching as far away as present-day Manila.

Taal Volcano and Lake are entirely located in the province of Batangas. The northern half of Volcano Island falls under the jurisdiction of the lake shore town of Talisay, and the southern half in San Nicolas. The other communities that encircle Taal Lake include the cities of Tanauan and Lipa, and the municipalities of Talisay, Laurel, Agoncillo, Santa Teresita, San Nicolas, Alitagtag, Cuenca, Balete, and Mataasnakahoy.

Permanent settlement on the island is prohibited by the Philippine Institute of Volcanology and Seismology (PHIVOLCS), declaring the whole Volcano Island as a high-risk area and a Permanent Danger Zone (PDZ). Despite the warnings, some families remain settled on the island, earning a living by fishing and farming crops in the rich volcanic soil.

Since the formation of the caldera, subsequent eruptions have created a volcanic island within the caldera, known as Volcano Island. The island consists of different overlapping cones and craters, of which forty-seven have been identified. Twenty six of these are tuff cones, five are cinder cones, and four are maars. The Main Crater Lake on Volcano Island is the largest lake on an island in a lake on an island in the world. This lake used to contain Vulcan Point, a small rocky island inside the lake. After the 2020 eruption, the Main Crater Lake temporarily disappeared due to volcanic activity, but had returned by March 2020.

Eruptions

Pre-20th century 
There were 42 recorded eruptions at Taal between 1572 and 1977. The first recorded eruption occurred in 1572, the year Augustinian friars founded the town of Taal on the shores of the lake (on what is now San Nicolas, Batangas). In 1591, another mild eruption took place, producing great masses of smoke from the crater. From 1605 to 1611, the volcano displayed such great activity that Father Tomas de Abreu had a huge cross of anubing wood erected on the brink of the crater.

Between 1707 and 1731, the center of volcanic activity shifted from the Main Crater to other parts of Volcano Island. The eruptions of 1707 and 1715 occurred in Binintiang Malaki (Giant Leg) crater, the cinder cone visible from Tagaytay Ridge, and was accompanied by thunder and lightning. Minor eruptions also occurred in Binintiang Munti crater on the westernmost tip of the island in 1709 and 1729. A more violent event happened on September 24, 1716, blowing out the entire southeastern portion of the crater of Calauit, opposite Mount Macolod. Father Manuel de Arce noted that the 1716 eruption "killed all the fishes...as if they had been cooked, since the water had been heated to a degree that it appeared to have been taken from a boiling caldron". The 1731 eruption off Pira-Piraso, the eastern tip of the island, created a new island.

The Main Crater began experiencing further activity on August 11, 1749, and its eruptions were particularly violent (VEI = 4) until 1753. Then came the great 200-day eruption of 1754, Taal Volcano's greatest recorded eruption, which lasted from May 15 to December 12. The eruption caused the relocation of the towns of Tanauan, Taal, Lipa and Sala. The Pansipit River was blocked, causing the water level in the lake to rise. Father Bencuchillo stated that of Taal, "nothing was left...except the walls of the church and convent...everything was buried beneath a layer of stones, mud, and ashes".

After the great eruption, Taal Volcano remained quiet for 54 years besides from a minor eruption in 1790. Not until March 1808 did another big eruption occur. The eruption brought great changes in the interior of the crater, according to chroniclers of that time. According to Friar Miguel Saderra Maso, "Before [the eruption], the bottom looked very deep and seemed unfathomable, but at the bottom, a liquid mass was seen in continual ebullition. After the eruption, the crater had widened and the pond within it had been reduced to one-third and the rest of the crater floor was higher and dry enough to walk over it. The height of the crater walls has diminished and near the center of the new crater floor, a little hill that continually emitted smoke. On its sides were several wells, one of which was especially remarkable for its size."

On July 19, 1874, an eruption of gases and ashes from the volcano killed all the livestock on the volcano island. From November 12–15, 1878, ashes ejected by the volcano covered the entire island. Another eruption took place in 1904, which created a new outlet in the southeastern wall of the principal crater. , the last eruption from the main crater was in 1911, which obliterated the crater floor creating the present lake. In 1965, a huge explosion sliced off a huge part of the island, moving activity to a new eruption center, Mount Tabaro.

1911 eruption 

One of the more devastating eruptions of Taal took place in January 1911. During the night of the 27th of that month, the seismographs at the Manila Observatory commenced to register frequent disturbances, which were at first of insignificant importance, but increased rapidly in frequency and intensity. The total recorded shocks on that day numbered 26. During the 28th there were recorded 217 distinct shocks, of which 135 were microseismic and 10 quite severe.

In Manila, in the early hours of January 30, 1911, people were awakened by what they at first perceived as loud thunder. The illusion was heightened when lightning illuminated the southern skies. A huge, fan-shaped cloud of what looked like black smoke ascended to great heights, crisscrossed with a brilliant display of volcanic lightning. This cloud finally shot up in the air, spread, then dissipated, marking the culmination of the eruption, at about 2:30 am.

On Volcano Island, the destruction was complete. It seems that when the black, fan-shaped cloud spread, it created a blast downward that forced hot steam and gases down the slopes of the crater, accompanied by a shower of hot mud and sand. Many trees had their bark shredded and cut away from the surface by the hot sand and mud. This shower was the main cause of the loss of life and destruction of property around the volcano. The fact that practically all the vegetation was bent downward, away from the crater, suggested that there must have been a very strong blast down the outside slopes of the cone. Very little vegetation was actually burned or even scorched. Six hours after the explosion, dust from the crater was noticeable in Manila as it settled on furniture and other polished surfaces. The solid matter ejected had a volume of between 70 and 80 million cubic metres (2.5 and 2.8 billion cu ft).

Death toll 
The eruption of the volcano claimed a reported 1100 lives and injured 199, although it is assumed that more perished than the official records show. The seven barangays that existed on the island previous to the eruption were completely wiped out. Post mortem examination of the victims seemed to show that practically all had died of scalding by hot steam or hot mud, or both. The devastating effects of the blast reached the west shore of the lake, where a number of villages were also destroyed. 702 cattle were killed and 543 nipa houses destroyed. Crops suffered from the deposit of ashes that fell to a depth of almost half an inch in places near the shore of the lake.

Aftermath 
It was also found that the southern shore of Lake Taal sank because of the eruption. No evidences of lava could be discovered anywhere, nor have geologists been able to trace any visible records of a lava flow having occurred at any time on the volcano during the eruption. Another peculiarity of the geologic aspects of Taal is the fact that no sulphur has been found on the volcano. The yellow deposits and encrustations noticeable in the crater and its vicinity are iron salts, according to chemical analysis. A slight smell of sulfur was perceptible at the volcano, which came from the gases that escaped from the crater.

Great changes took place in the crater after the eruption. Before 1911, the crater floor was higher than Taal lake and had several separate openings in which there were lakes of different colors. There was a green lake, a yellow lake, a red lake and some holes filled with hot water from which steam issued. Many places were covered with a shaky crust of volcanic material, full of crevices, which was always hot and on which it was rather dangerous to walk. Immediately after the explosion, the various colored lakes had disappeared and in their place was one large lake, about ten feet below the level of the lake surrounding the island. The crater lake gradually rose to the level of the water in Taal Lake. Popular opinions after the creation of the lake held that the presence of the water in the crater cooled off the material below and thus lessened the chances of an explosion or the extinction of the volcano. This explanation has since been rejected by experts. The subsequent eruptions in 1965 and successive activity came from a new eruptive center, Mount Tabaro.

Ten years after the eruption, no changes in the general outline of the island could be discerned from a distance. On the island, however, many changes were noted. The vegetation had increased; great stretches that were formerly barren and covered with white ashes and cinders became covered with vegetation.

1965 to 1977 eruptions 

There was another period of volcanic activity on Taal from 1965 to 1977, with the area of activity concentrated in the vicinity of Mount Tabaro. The 1965 eruption was classified as phreatomagmatic, generated by the interaction of magma with the lake water to produce the violent explosion that cut an embayment on Volcano Island. The eruption generated "cold" base surges which travelled several kilometers across Lake Taal, devastating villages on the lake shore and killing about a hundred people.

One American geologist, who had witnessed an atomic bomb explosion as a soldier, visited the volcano shortly after the 1965 eruption and recognised "base surge" (now called pyroclastic surge) as a process in volcanic eruption.

Precursory signs were not interpreted correctly until after the eruption; the population of the island was evacuated only after the onset of the eruption.

After nine months of repose, Taal reactivated on July 5, 1966, with another phreatomagmatic eruption from Mount Tabaro, followed by another similar eruption on August 16, 1967. The Strombolian eruptions, which started five months after on January 31, 1968, produced the first historical lava fountaining witnessed from Taal. Another Strombolian eruption followed a year later on October 29, 1969. The massive flows from the two eruptions eventually covered the bay created by the 1965 eruption, reaching the shore of Lake Taal. The last major activities on the volcano during this period were the phreatic eruptions of 1976 and 1977.

Early 21st century 

Since the 1977 eruption, the volcano had shown signs of unrest since 1991, with strong seismic activity and ground fracturing events as well as the formation of small mud pots and mud geysers on parts of the island. The Philippine Institute of Volcanology and Seismology (PHIVOLCS) regularly issued notices and warnings about current activity at Taal, including about the ongoing seismic unrest.

2008 
On August 28, the PHIVOLCS notified the public and authorities that the Taal seismic network recorded 10 volcanic earthquakes from 05:30 to 15:00.

2010 
On June 8, the PHIVOLCS raised the volcano status to Alert Level 2 (scale is 0–5, 0 referring to No Alert status), which indicates the volcano is undergoing magmatic intrusion, a precursor to an eruption. PHIVOLCS reminded the general public that the Main Crater was off-limits due to the possibility of hazardous steam-driven explosions and build-up of toxic gases. Areas with hot ground and steam emissions, such as portions of the Daang Kastila Trail, are considered hazardous. The composition of Main Crater Lake water has shown above normal values of MgCl, SO4Cl, and Total Dissolved Solids. There has been ground steaming, accompanied by hissing sounds, on the northern and northeast sides of the main crater. On April 26, the volcanic seismicity was reported to have had increased.

2011 
From April 9 to July 5, the alert level on Taal Volcano was raised from 1 to 2 because of the increased seismicity of Volcano Island. Frequency peaked at about 115 tremors on May 30 with a maximum intensity of IV, accompanied by rumbling sounds. Magma was intruding towards the surface, as indicated by continuing high rates of CO2 emissions in the Main Crater Lake and sustained seismic activity. Field measurements on May 24 showed that lake temperatures had increased slightly, pH values were slightly more acidic, and water levels were  higher. A deformation survey conducted around Volcano Island from April 26 to May 3 showed that the volcano edifice had inflated slightly relative to the April 5–11 survey.

2019 to 2022 activity and eruption

2019 
In 2019, Alert Level 1 was raised on the volcano because of frequent volcanic activities since March. Based on the 24-hour monitoring of the Taal Volcano's seismic network, 57 volcanic earthquakes were observed from the morning of November 11 to the morning of November 12.

2020 

The volcano erupted on the afternoon of January 12, 2020, with the alert level of the Philippine Institute of Volcanology and Seismology (PHIVOLCS) escalating from Alert Level 2 to Alert Level 4. It was an eruption from the main crater on Volcano Island. The eruption spewed ashes to Calabarzon, Metro Manila, some parts of Central Luzon, and Pangasinan, in the Ilocos Region, which cancelled classes, work schedules, and flights. Ashfalls and volcanic thunderstorms were reported, and forced evacuations were made from the island. There were also warnings of a possible volcanic tsunami. The volcano produced volcanic lightning above its crater with ash clouds. The eruption progressed into magmatic eruption, characterized by a lava fountain with thunder and lightning. By January 26, 2020, PHIVOLCS observed an inconsistent, but decreasing volcanic activity in Taal, prompting the agency to downgrade its warning to Alert Level 3. On February 14, 2020, PHIVOLCS downgraded the volcano's warning to Alert Level 2, due to consistent decreased volcanic activity. A total of 39 people died in the eruption, mostly because they refused to leave their homes or suffered health-related problems during the evacuation.

2021 

In February 2021, residents from Taal Volcano Island were preemptively evacuated due to the volcano's increasing activity. On March 9, 2021, PHIVOLCS raised the alert level from 1 to 2. In June 2021, the volcano's emission of sulfur dioxide gas caused vog to appear over nearby provinces, and even Metro Manila. On July 1, 2021, the volcano erupted at around 3:16 p.m, and the alert level was raised from Alert Level 2 to Level 3. Five eruptions were recorded on July 7.

On July 23, PHIVOLCS lowered the alert level status from Alert Level 3 to Level 2.

2022 
Between January 29 and 30, 2022, the volcano had nine phreatomagmatic bursts on its main crater. On March 26, PHIVOLCS raised the volcano's alert level status to Alert Level 3 due to a short lived-phreatomagmatic eruption with the evacuation of around 1,100 residents around the area and surrounding towns. Two phreatomagmatic events were recorded in which it emitted toxic plumes of 800 meters and 400 meters. Locals have then reported an explosion near the crater around 1:00 PM (Philippine Time) with subsequent spurs of ashes around the lake. High level toxic emissions have been recorded as well as 14 volcanic earthquakes and 10 volcanic tremors within the day. The next day on March 27, volcanic activities were relatively tranquil with almost no recorded earthquakes although sulfur dioxide emission still measured at 1,140 tons. The National Disaster Risk Reduction and Management Council (NDRRMC) estimated that some 3,850 individuals were displaced on Monday, March 28. On April 9, PHIVOLCS downgraded again the alert level status from Level 3 to Level 2. It was then downgraded further to Alert Level 1 after around three months on July 11.

On August 3, PHILVOLCS recorded a low-level unrest of the volcano with the increase of sulfur dioxide (SO2) emission. Thereupon, the alert level 1 warning was raised although evacuation of nearby population was not yet implemented. Abnormal spike of sulfur in the atmosphere was measured up to 12,125 tons that day. For comparison, daily and usual sulfur dioxide emission was measured up to 4,952 tons since July 15. Volcanic smog, or vog, and toxic gases were largely observed in Batangas and surrounding towns since August 2.

Activity monitoring

Alert levels
PHIVOLCS maintains a distinct Alert Level system for six volcanoes in the Philippines, including Taal Volcano. There are six levels in the system, numbered 0 to 5.

Eruption precursors at Taal
 Increase in frequency of volcanic quakes with occasional seismic events accompanied by rumbling sounds.
 On the Main Crater Lake, changes in the water temperature, level, and bubbling or boiling activity on the lake. Before the 1965 eruption began, the lake's temperature rose to about  degrees above normal. However, with some eruptions, there is no reported increase in the lake's temperature.
 Development of new or reactivation of old thermal areas like fumaroles, geysers or mudpots.
 Ground inflation or ground fissuring.
 Increase in temperature of ground probe holes on monitoring stations.
 Strong sulfuric odor or irritating fumes similar to rotten eggs.
 Fish dieoffs and the drying up of vegetation.

Other possible precursors 
Volcanologists measuring the concentration of radon gas in the soil on Volcano island measured an anomalous increase of radon concentration by a factor of six in October 1994. A typhoon had passed through the area a few days before the radon spike was measured, but when Typhoon Angela, one of the most powerful to strike the area in ten years, crossed Luzon on almost the same track a year later, no radon spike was measured. Typhoons, therefore, were ruled out as the cause, and strong evidence suggests that the radon originated in the stress accumulation before the earthquake.

References

External links 

 
 Taal Volcano Eruptions 1572–1911 from RWTH Aachen University Web Site
 Taal Volcano Eruptions 1600–2010 from Google

Volcanoes of Luzon
Taal Lake
Landforms of Batangas
National geological monuments of the Philippines
Decade Volcanoes
Calderas of the Philippines
Volcanic crater lakes
VEI-6 volcanoes
Active volcanoes of the Philippines
Protected landscapes of the Philippines
21st-century volcanic events
20th-century volcanic events
16th-century volcanic events
Tourist attractions in Batangas
Holocene calderas
Volcanic lakes of the Philippines